Diana Russell may refer to:

Diana Russell, Duchess of Bedford (1710–1735), member of the Spencer family known for the unsuccessful attempt of marriage with Frederick, Prince of Wales
Caroline Diana Rosalind Russell, aka Diana Russell (1874–1971), English noblewoman, appointed Member of the Order of the British Empire (M.B.E.) in 1918
Diana E. H. Russell (1938-2020), feminist writer and activist

See also
Diane Russell, member of the Maine House of Representatives
Diane Russell (NYPD Blue)